Bozzio Levin Stevens is an American supergroup power trio formed by drummer Terry Bozzio (Frank Zappa, U.K., Missing Persons, Steve Vai, Jeff Beck), bassist and Chapman Stick player Tony Levin (Peter Gabriel, King Crimson, Liquid Tension Experiment) and guitarist Steve Stevens (Billy Idol, Michael Jackson, Vince Neil). They have recorded two albums via Magna Carta. 

Their music is mostly improvised and touches on rock, fusion, jazz and instrumental classical styles.

Discography

References 
   

Rock music supergroups
American progressive rock groups
Musical groups established in 1997